Kiril Nikolayevich Serikov (born June 13, 1982) is a Russian luger who has competed since 2001. He finished 24th in the men's singles event at the 2006 Winter Olympics in Turin.

Serikov's best finish at the FIL World Luge Championships was 26th in the men's singles event at Igls in 2007.

References
 2006 luge men's singles results
 FIL-Luge profile

External links
 
 
 

1982 births
Living people
Lugers at the 2006 Winter Olympics
Russian male lugers
Olympic lugers of Russia